Mihkel is an Estonian masculine given name, a version of Michael.

People named Mihkel include:
Mihkel Ainsalu (born 1996), footballer
Mihkel Aksalu (born 1984), football goalkeeper
Mikk-Mihkel Arro (born 1984), decathlete
Mihkel Järveoja (born 1986), orienteer
Mihkel Juhkam (1884–1942), politician
Mihkel Jürna (1899–1972), writer and translator
Mihkel Kerem (born 1981), composer and violinist
Mihkel Kirves (born 1996), basketball player 
Mihkel Klaassen (1880–1952), judge
Mihkel Kraav (born 1966), historian, data communications specialist and politician
Mihkel Kukk (born 1983), javelin thrower
Mihkel Lepper (1900–1980), actor
Mihkel Leppik (1932–2021), rowing coach
Mihkel Lüdig (1880–1958), composer, organist and choir conductor
Mihkel Martna (1860–1934), politician and journalist
Mihkel Mathiesen (1918–2003), statesman
Mihkel Mattisen (born 1976), musician, pop singer, songwriter and music producer
Mihkel Mihkelson (1899–1943), politician
Mihkel Mutt (born 1953), writer and arts journalist
Mihkel Poll (born 1986), pianist
Mihkel Pung (1876–1941), politician
Mihkel Raud (born 1969), musician, television personality and politician 
Mihkel Rõuk (1891–1941), politician
Mihkel Truusööt (1903–1993), politician and businessman
Mihkel Tüür (born 1976), architect
Mihkel Veske (1843–1890), poet and linguist

See also
Mihkel (film), a 2018 Icelandic-Estonian film

References

Estonian masculine given names